In statistics, the concordance correlation coefficient measures the agreement between two variables, e.g., to evaluate reproducibility or for inter-rater reliability.

Definition
The form of the concordance correlation coefficient  as

This follows from its definition as

When the concordance correlation coefficient is computed on a -length data set (i.e.,  paired data values , for ), the form is

where the mean is computed as

and the variance

and the covariance

Whereas the ordinary correlation coefficient (Pearson's) is immune to whether the biased or unbiased versions for estimation of the variance is used, the concordance correlation coefficient is not. In the original article Lin suggested the 1/N normalization,
while in another article Nickerson appears to have used the 1/(N-1),
i.e., the concordance correlation coefficient may be computed slightly differently between implementations.

Relation to other measures of correlation
The concordance correlation coefficient is nearly identical to some of the measures called intra-class correlations. Comparisons of the concordance correlation coefficient with an "ordinary" intraclass correlation on different data sets found only small differences between the two correlations, in one case on the third decimal. It has also been stated that the ideas for concordance correlation coefficient "are quite similar to results already published by Krippendorff
in 1970".

In the original article Lin suggested a form for multiple classes (not just 2). Over ten years later a correction to this form was issued.

One example of the use of the concordance correlation coefficient is in a comparison of analysis method for functional magnetic resonance imaging brain scans.

External links
 Statistical Calculator. Provided by NIWA, it is an online version of Lin’s concordance used to assess the degree of agreement between two continuous variables, such as chemical or microbiological concentrations. It calculates the value of Lin’s concordance correlation coefficient. Values of ±1 denote perfect concordance and discordance; a value of zero denotes its complete absence. Statistical testing procedures for Cohen's kappa and for Lin’s concordance correlation coefficient are included in the calculator. These procedures guard against the risk of claiming good agreement when that has happened merely by "good luck".

References 

For a small Excel and VBA implementation by Peter Urbani see here

Covariance and correlation
Inter-rater reliability